Kim Young-jun (born 23 February 1980) is a former South Korean tennis player.

Kim has a career high ATP singles ranking of 255 achieved on 5 July 2010. He also has a career high ATP doubles ranking of 558 achieved on 26 May 2003.

Kim has 1 ATP Challenger Tour title at the 2003 Busan Open.

External links

1980 births
Living people
South Korean male tennis players
Universiade medalists in tennis
Tennis players at the 2010 Asian Games
Universiade bronze medalists for South Korea
Asian Games competitors for South Korea
Medalists at the 2003 Summer Universiade
21st-century South Korean people